Ronnie O'Bard (born June 11, 1958) is a former American football defensive back. He played for the San Diego Chargers in 1985.

References

1958 births
Living people
American football defensive backs
Idaho Vandals football players
BYU Cougars football players
San Diego Chargers players